Giovanni Battista Lazzaroni (1626-1698) was an Italian painter of the Baroque period.

He was born in Cremona. He was a pupil of Giovanni Battista Tortiroli. He is known for painting in the style of Palma the Younger, depicting portraits and historical subjects. Active in Parma, Milan, and finally in Piacenza.

References

17th-century Italian painters
Italian male painters
Painters from Cremona
Italian Baroque painters
1651 deaths
1621 births